New Haven is a census-designated place (CDP) in Crosby Township, Hamilton County, Ohio, United States. The population was 572 at the 2020 census.

History
New Haven was platted as a village by Joab Comstock in 1815. In the 19th century the village had a post office, but was known as "Preston". This was necessary since there was already a New Haven in Huron County, Ohio, and the name was assigned by the first postmaster, Alexander Preston Cavender.

Geography

References

Census-designated places in Hamilton County, Ohio
Census-designated places in Ohio
Populated places established in 1815
1815 establishments in Ohio